The London Silver Vaults is a large subterranean market that opened as The Chancery Lane Safe Deposit on 7 May 1885. Originally renting out strong rooms to hold household silver, jewellery and documents, it transitioned to housing silver dealers in secure premises a few years later. It is located on Chancery Lane, London, WC2A 1QS.

The building above the vaults was struck directly with a bomb during World War II – however, this did not damage the vaults at all, despite the building being destroyed. A new building, Chancery House, was constructed ten years later, and since 1953 it has been in its present format, with shops based underground. All of the shops have been owned for at least 50 years by the same families. It is said that it has "the largest single collection of silver for sale in the world", contained within more than forty shops.

References

External links 
 

Organisations based in the City of London
Silver
Buildings and structures in the City of London
Tourist attractions in the City of London
Subterranean London